Bernard Joseph Barton (born 1951) is an Irish barrister who was a judge of the High Court between April 2014 and March 2021.

Legal career 
Barton was educated in University College Dublin, the Irish Management Institute and the King's Inns. He became a barrister in 1977 and a senior counsel in 1997. His practice as a barrister was focused on tort, contract and personal injury litigation. He also lectured in the King's Inns.

Judicial career 
He was appointed to the High Court in April 2014. Barton has heard a variety of criminal and civil matters in the High Court. He has heard cases including proceedings involving extradition, examinership, judicial review, employment law, and personal injuries.

As of 2020, Barton is the Judge in Charge of the Jury List of the High Court.

He has heard several notable defamation cases. In 2018 he was the trial judge for Paudie Coffey against the Kilkenny People, Paddy McKillen against the Irish Daily Mail, and Maurice McCabe against The Irish Times. He presided over Denis O'Brien against The Sunday Business Post and Gerald Kean against the Irish Daily Star in 2019.

Barton issued an arrest warrant for a juror who failed to return to court during a defamation case in July 2019.

He retired as a judge in March 2021.

Personal life
He is married to Anne Marie with whom he has four children. He is a member of the Military and Hospitaller Order of Saint Lazarus of Jerusalem and a former Grand Prior of the Grand Priory of Ireland. Prior to his appointment to the High Court he was a member of Fine Gael.

References

Living people
High Court judges (Ireland)
Alumni of University College Dublin
1951 births
Irish barristers
Alumni of King's Inns